In taxonomy, Methanothermobacter is a genus of the Methanobacteriaceae.  The species within this genus are thermophilic and grow best at temperatures between 55°C and 65°C. They are methanogens; they use carbon dioxide and hydrogen as substrates to produce methane for energy.

Phylogeny
The currently accepted taxonomy is based on the List of Prokaryotic names with Standing in Nomenclature (LPSN)  and National Center for Biotechnology Information (NCBI).

See also
 List of Archaea genera

References

Further reading

Scientific journals

Scientific books

External links

Methanothermobacter at BacDive -  the Bacterial Diversity Metadatabase

Archaea genera
Euryarchaeota